Miquette (French: Miquette et sa mère) is a 1950 French comedy film directed by Henri-Georges Clouzot and starring Louis Jouvet, Bourvil and Saturnin Fabre. The film was an adaptation of the play Miquette et sa mere by Robert de Flers and Gaston Arman de Caillavet, which had previously been adapted into 1934 and 1940 films. The film is set around the turn-of-the century.

It was shot at the Joinville Studios in Paris. The film's sets were designed by the art director Georges Wakhevitch. Clouzot was reluctant to make the film, but was contractually obliged to. It was not a commercial or critical success.

Partial cast 
 Louis Jouvet as Monchablon 
 Bourvil as Urbain de la Tour-Mirande 
 Saturnin Fabre as Le marquis 
 Danièle Delorme as Miquette 
 Mireille Perrey as Madame veuve Hermine Grandier 
 Pauline Carton as Perrine 
 Jeanne Fusier-Gir as Mademoiselle Poche 
 Madeleine Suffel as Noémie 
 Maurice Schutz as Panouillard 
 Pierre Olaf as Le jeune premier 
 Paul Barge as L'abbé

References

Bibliography 
 Lloyd, Christopher. Henri-Georges Clouzot. Manchester University Press, 2007.

External links 
 

1950 films
French black-and-white films
1950s French-language films
Films directed by Henri-Georges Clouzot
French films based on plays
Films produced by Raymond Borderie
Films with screenplays by Henri-Georges Clouzot
Films produced by Robert Dorfmann
Remakes of French films
Films set in the 1900s
1950s historical comedy films
French historical comedy films
1950 comedy films
Films shot at Joinville Studios
1950s French films